Pleiospermium longisepalum (also known as Banguey Island orangeaster) is a species of plant in the family Rutaceae. It is endemic to Borneo where it is confined to Sabah.

References

External links

longisepalum
Endemic flora of Borneo
Flora of Sabah
Vulnerable plants
Taxonomy articles created by Polbot